Thomas or Tom Garland may refer to:

 Thomas Garland (broadcaster) (1877–1964), New Zealand broadcaster and businessman
 Thomas J. Garland (1866–1931), American Episcopal bishop
 Tom Garland (trade unionist) (1893–1952), Scottish-born Australian trade unionist
 Tom Garland (Port Adelaide footballer), Australian rules footballer who played for Port Adelaide in the 1950s
 Tom Garland (footballer, born 1943), Australian rules footballer who played for Richmond